1590 papal conclave may refer to:

 September 1590 papal conclave, which elected Urban VII to succeed Sixtus V
 October–December 1590 papal conclave, which elected Gregory XIV to succeed Urban VII